Marcio Ribeiro da Cruz (born April 24, 1978) is a Brazilian Jiu-Jitsu practitioner and mixed martial artist. In Jiu-Jitsu, he is a 5th degree black belt under Carlos Gracie Jr. and is a six-time IBJJF Mundials World Champion, five-time IBJJF Brazilian Nationals Champion, eight-time IBJJF Pan-American Champion, 2003 ADCC World Champion, two-time Abu Dhabi World Jiu Jitsu Legends Champion and UFC Veteran Fighter. His nickname "Pé de Pano" was given to him by his friends at the Gracie Barra academy in Rio and it is the Portuguese version of the name of Woody Woodpecker's horse, SugarFoot. He competed in the UFC and also had a one fight stint as an alternate for the New York Pitbulls of the International Fight League.

Background
Cruz was born in Rio de Janeiro and had a brief stint with Karate when he was 12 years old before being introduced to Brazilian jiu-jitsu by a friend. Although he had wanted to begin training in the sport immediately, due to the lack of a nearby gym, he began learning judo. It was not until the age of 17 that Cruz began his official training in jiu-jitsu and would go on to win his first major title in only three years.

Championships and achievements

Grappling credentials

Cruz is a six-time Brazilian Jiu-Jitsu World Champion, five-time Brazilian Jiu-Jitsu National Champion, eight-time Brazilian Jiu-Jitsu Pan-American Champion and the 2003 ADCC World Champion, He is undefeated at the Abu Dhabi World Jiu Jitsu Legends, he won the Championship two years in a row (2016 and 2017). Prof. Márcio Cruz won the Black Belt Absolute Division twice, being awarded two unique Champion Ring in a 2018 IBJJF Celebration. People he has defeated include: Ricco Rodriguez, Mike Van Arsdale, Roger Gracie, Gabriel Gonzaga, Paulo Filho, Fabrício Werdum, Xande Ribeiro, Marcelo Garcia, Saulo Ribeiro, Fernando Augusto, Jeff Monson, and Fernado "Margarida" Pontes. Since he started his mixed martial arts career, he has been training MMA with Roberto "Gordo" Correa and he fights under the Marcio Cruz BJJ team and Ring Team. His favorite Technique is Triangle Choke

Mixed martial arts career

As a professional MMA fighter, Cruz has fought in the Ultimate Fighting Championship, defeating former UFC Heavyweight Champion Frank Mir by TKO at UFC 57. He also holds a win over Keigo Kunihara at UFC 55. He lost a split decision to Jeff Monson, whom he had previously defeated twice in grappling tournaments, at UFC 59. Cruz' second MMA loss was to Andrei Arlovski at UFC 66, in December 2006, by first-round knockout.

In June 2007 in the IFL he defeated Rafael Feijao by disqualification when Feijao used an illegal kick 1:18 before the end of the 3rd and final round.  In June 2008 Cruz defeated Mu Bae Choi at Sengoku 3 via submission (triangle armbar). In April 2009 he defeated UFC veteran Dan Christison by unanimous decision.

On August 22, 2009, he beat Tom Sauer via TKO in the second round. With this victory he won the World Fighting Organization Heavyweight Championship. He successfully defended his belt by submitting Dave Yost with a Rear Naked Choke in the first round on April 3, 2010.

Cruz had to withdraw from Abu Dhabi Fighting Championship with a spinal injury in May 2010.

After 15 months of inactivity, Cruz faced Glover Teixeira at Clube da Luta on July 20, 2011 losing via TKO (punches) at 4:21 in the second round. Cruz weighed in at an out-of-shape 256-pounds.

Cruz was scheduled to make his Light heavyweight debut against fellow UFC veteran Gilbert Yvel on November 2, 2012, at Resurrection Fighting Alliance 4 in Las Vegas, Nevada. However, Yvel was later forced to pull out of the bout due to an injury.  Cruz ended up facing Joe Yager at the event and won the fight by submission.

Personal life

Marcio Cruz is a Christian, has been married since 2009 to Ariana Cruz and has 4 kids named, Renan, Matthew, Clara and Aaylah.
Currently Marcio Cruz runs a Brazilian Jiu-Jitsu Academy in Tampa, Florida and a Second Location in Carrollwood, Florida.

Mixed martial arts record

|-
| Win
| align=center| 8–3
| Joe Yager
| Submission (inverted triangle choke)
| RFA 4: Griffin vs. Escudero
| 
| align=center| 2
| align=center| 4:16
| Las Vegas, Nevada, United States
| 
|-
| Loss
| align=center| 7–3
| Glover Teixeira
| TKO (punches)
| Clube da Luta
| 
| align=center| 2
| align=center| 4:21
| Rio de Janeiro, Brazil
| 
|-
| Win
| align=center| 7–2
| David Yost
| Submission (rear-naked choke)
| Art of Fighting 7 - Payday
| 
| align=center| 1
| align=center| 1:22
| Tampa, Florida, United States
| 
|-
| Win
| align=center| 6–2
| Tommy Sauer
| TKO (punches)
| Art of Fighting 4 - Damage
| 
| align=center| 2
| align=center| 3:43
| Tampa, Florida, United States
| 
|-
| Win
| align=center| 5–2
| Dan Christison
| Decision (unanimous)
| ICF: Breakout
| 
| align=center| 3
| align=center| 5:00
| Cincinnati, Ohio, United States
| 
|-
| Win
| align=center| 4–2
| Choi Mu-Bae
| Submission (triangle armbar)
| World Victory Road Presents: Sengoku 3
| 
| align=center| 1
| align=center| 4:37
| Saitama, Saitama, Japan
| 
|-
| Win
| align=center| 3–2
| Rafael Cavalcante
| DQ (illegal kick)
| IFL: Las Vegas
| 
| align=center| 3
| align=center| 3:42
| Las Vegas, Nevada, United States
| 
|-
| Loss
| align=center| 2–2
| Andrei Arlovski
| KO (punches)
| UFC 66: Liddell vs. Ortiz
| 
| align=center| 1
| align=center| 3:15
| Las Vegas, Nevada, United States
| 
|-
| Loss
| align=center| 2–1
| Jeff Monson
| Decision (split)
| UFC 59: Reality Check
| 
| align=center| 3
| align=center| 5:00
| Anaheim, California, United States
| 
|-
| Win
| align=center| 2–0
| Frank Mir
| TKO (punches and elbows)
| UFC 57: Liddell vs. Couture 3
| 
| align=center| 1
| align=center| 4:15
| Las Vegas, Nevada, United States
| 
|-
| Win
| align=center| 1–0
| Keigo Kunihara
| Submission (rear-naked choke)
| UFC 55
| 
| align=center| 2
| align=center| 1:02
| Uncasville, Connecticut, United States
|

See also
List of male mixed martial artists

References

External links
 
 
 Marcio Cruz Brazilian Jiu Jitsu School in Tampa

Brazilian Christians
Brazilian male mixed martial artists
Light heavyweight mixed martial artists
Heavyweight mixed martial artists
Mixed martial artists utilizing karate
Mixed martial artists utilizing judo
Mixed martial artists utilizing Brazilian jiu-jitsu
Brazilian practitioners of Brazilian jiu-jitsu
Sportspeople from Rio de Janeiro (city)
Brazilian expatriate sportspeople in the United States
Brazilian male karateka
Brazilian male judoka
1978 births
Living people
People awarded a black belt in Brazilian jiu-jitsu
People from Lutz, Florida
Ultimate Fighting Championship male fighters